Morteza Qoli Khan Qajar (1750/1755 – either 1798 in St. Petersburg or 1800 at Astrakhan) - was a prince of Persia's Qajar dynasty, and the brother of Agha Mohammad Khan. A protégé of the Russian Empire, he lived in St. Petersburg at the end of the reign of Catherine II.

Biography
Around the mid 18th century, after the murder of Nader Shah, widespread crisis began; out of this, eventually, after some decades of Zand rule, Agha Mohammad Khan of the Qajar tribe emerged victorious. As a result, he became the new king of Iran. Related to the same course of history, was Russia's role. Russia was actively meddling in domestic Iranian affairs since the downfall of the Safavids and the Russo-Persian War of 1722-1723 of about the same time. Though Russia's political ambitions ceased when the strong Nader Shah emerged, they started again after Nader's death in 1747.

In 1787, a last attempt was made to reach an agreement between Agha Mohammad Khan and the government of Catherine II. Thereafter, Russia decided to deal with his rebel brother, Morteza Qoli, whom it intended to install on the Iranian throne as the tsaritsa's vassal. Morteza, fleeing from his brother, came to St. Petersburg, where he was well received by Empress Catherine II, who pursued political goals against Persia. Catherine however delayed the plan until the 1796 expedition.

References

Sources
 

1750s births
1798 deaths
1800 deaths
Qajar princes
Iranian emigrants to the Russian Empire
Politicians of the Russian Empire